École Franco-Polonaise (EFP), full name École Franco-Polonaise des Nouvelles Technologies d'Information et Telecommunication (Franco-Polish School of New Information and Communication Technologies), was a private technical university, created in Poznań, Poland, in 1993 in cooperation with the city of Rennes and closed in 1997 after the French withdrew from their financial commitment.

EFP was a pioneer graduate school bringing to Poland new concepts of interdisciplinary education with main focus on 4 domains: 
 Information Technology, 
 Telecommunications, 
 Economics 
 Foreign Languages (French and English)

References 

 Warsaw Voice 
 Archives of Rennes city

Education in Poznań
1993 establishments in Poland